The United Kingdom, under the designation Great Britain and Northern Ireland, has competed in the European Championships since the inaugural event in 2018. Great Britain is the most successful country at the European Championships, winning 50 gold medals and 134 overall. The country finished second in the medal table in both 2018 and 2022, but by total medals finished first in 2018 and joint first in 2022.

Competitors in table tennis events are listed as representing their home nation rather than Great Britain as England, Scotland and Wales each have their own membership of the European Table Tennis Union which organises the table tennis competition at the European Championships.

Medal count

See also
England at the European Championships
Great Britain at the Olympics
Great Britain at the European Games

References

National sports teams of the United Kingdom
Nations at the 2018 European Championships
Nations at the 2022 European Championships